Count Teodor Pejačević of Virovitica (24 September 1855 – 22 July 1928) was a Croatian politician, member of Pejačević family, who served as Ban of Croatia-Slavonia between 1903 and 1907.

He was born in Našice as the eldest son of Ladislav Pejačević, a Ban of Croatia (1880–1883). His mother was the Hungarian baroness Gabrijela /Gabrielle/ Döry de Jobaháza.

He served as a long-term župan of Virovitica County.

At the beginning of the 20th century, he was faced with a new direction of Croatian policy marked by political alliance between Croats and Serbs in Austria-Hungary for mutual benefit. A Croat-Serb Coalition was formed in 1905 and it governed the Croatian lands from 1906 until the dissolution of the Dual Monarchy in 1918. As Pejačević supported the ruling Coalition in its resistance towards the Hungarian quest in 1907 to introduce the Hungarian language to be the official language on railways in Croatia, he was forced to resign.

He also took part as the Minister for Croatia, Slavonia and Dalmatia in the Hungarian Government from 1913 to 1916. However, during World War I he was interned in France on 22 August 1914. After that he was substituted by the Prime Minister István Tisza.

Pejačević died in Vienna. Among his children, the best known is his daughter Dora, a Croatian composer.

In Croatian film Countess Dora (1993) he is played by Tonko Lonza.

References
 Neda Engelsfeld: "Povijest hrvatske države i prava: razdoblje od 18. do 20. stoljeća", Pravni fakultet, Zagreb, 2002. 
 Magyar Életrajzi Lexikon

Teodor
1855 births
1928 deaths
People from Našice
Croatian Austro-Hungarians
Bans of Croatia
Counts of Croatia
Ministers of Croatian Affairs of Hungary
People from Slavonia
20th-century Croatian nobility